Jonnada is an Indian village in Alamuru mandal of East Godavari district, Andhra Pradesh. The village is on the bank of River Godavari (Gautami). National Highway 16 passes through it.

References 

Villages in East Godavari district